Solar is a surname. People with the surname include:

 C.J. Solar (born 1992), American musician
 Cristóbal del Solar (born 1993), Chilean golf player
 El Solar, (born 1956), masked Mexican professional wrestler
 Gabriela Pérez del Solar (born 1968), Peruvian former volleyball player and politician
 José del Solar (born 1967), Peruvian football player
 Lola Solar (1904–1989), Austrian teacher and politician
 Martín Solar (born 2000), Spanish football player
 Nicanor González del Solar (born 1943), Argentine sports journalist and former rugby union player
 Xul Solar (1887–1963), Argentine artist